Turkish Airlines Flight 5904 was a Boeing 737-400 on an international repositioning flight from Adana Şakirpaşa Airport in Adana, Turkey to King Abdulaziz International Airport in Jeddah, Saudi Arabia which crashed on 7 April 1999 in the vicinity of Ceyhan, Adana Province in southern Turkey some eight minutes after takeoff. The flight was on its way to Saudi Arabia to pick up pilgrims from Jeddah, and as such took off without any passengers on board. All six crew members were killed in the crash.

Flight
The aircraft was a Boeing 737-400, built in 1995, registered as TC-JEP, and named Trakya. Owned by ILFC, an American aircraft lessor, it was equipped with two CFM International CFM56 engines and had accumulated around 11,600 flight hours in 6,360 flight cycles up until the time of the crash.

The preceding flight from King Abdulaziz International Airport in Jeddah, Saudi Arabia had uneventfully transferred 150 pilgrims returning from the hajj to Adana Şakirpaşa Airport, where it landed at around 23:45 EET (20:45 UTC). Remaining on the ground for around one hour for refueling,  Flight 5904 took off with a new crew – two pilots and four flight attendants – and around 10 to 15 tons of fuel at 00:36 EET to pick up more pilgrims from Jeddah.

Before takeoff, upon request by the crew, the air traffic controller at Incirlik Air Base relayed the weather report, informing the crew that the entire aerodrome was completely covered by thunderstorms and that the thunderstorms were moving from the south towards the north.

Crash
All six occupants were instantly killed.

The crash resulted in a large explosion that was reported near Hamdili. After the aircraft vanished from radar, air traffic controllers at Adana Airport and Incirlik Air Base immediately notified the Gendarmerie and the police to initiate search and rescue efforts.

Investigation
The investigation into the accident was carried out by Turkey's Directorate General of Civil Aviation (DGCA). The cockpit voice recorder revealed that while the crew was struggling to regain control of the aircraft, at least some of the four flight attendants were inside the cockpit panicking and screaming. The copilot was heard telling the captain "aman ağabey, gittik, gidiyoruz, bas.." (which roughly translates into "Oh brother, we've gone, we're going, push...").

Final report
The final report concluded that:

References

Airliner accidents and incidents caused by ice
Aviation accidents and incidents in 1999
Aviation accidents and incidents in Turkey
5904
1999 in Turkey
Accidents and incidents involving the Boeing 737 Classic
Aviation accidents and incidents caused by loss of control
Airliner accidents and incidents caused by pilot error
Airliner accidents and incidents caused by weather
History of Adana Province
1999 meteorology
April 1999 events in Europe